Bloomfield High School is the sole public high school serving the town of Bloomfield, Connecticut, United States.

Overview
Bloomfield High School has been a four-year high school since 1985, changing from a three-year high school as the school age population and public school attendance declined.  The campus consists of the Bloomfield High School main building and the Harris Agricultural Science Center.

Notable alumni

 Dwight Anderson (class of 2000) - football player for the Saskatchewan Roughriders
 Marcus Cooper (Class of 2008) - cornerback for the Chicago Bears
 Dwight Freeney (class of 1998) - football player (Super Bowl XLI-winning Indianapolis Colts)
 Jimmy Greene (class of 1993) - Grammy Award-nominated jazz alto saxophonist
 Jessica Hecht (class of 1982) - actress
 Tyrique Jones (born 1997) - basketball player for Hapoel Tel Aviv in the Israeli Basketball Premier League
 Jay Karas (class of 1990) - film and television director and producer
 Matt Lawrence (class of 2003) -  football player for the Baltimore Ravens
 Andrew Pinnock (class of 1999) - former NFL football player
 Lewis Rome (class of 1950) - Bloomfield mayor and Connecticut state senator
 Anika Noni Rose (class of 1990) - Tony Award-winning singer-actress
 Nykesha Sales (class of 1994) - professional women's basketball player
 Kory Sheets (class of 2004) - running back for the Oakland Raiders
 Julian Stanford (class of 2008) - Football player for the Carolina Panthers
 Doug Wimbish - Bass Player for Living Colour

References

External links
 

Bloomfield, Connecticut
Schools in Hartford County, Connecticut
Public high schools in Connecticut